The 2017 Artistic Gymnastics World Championships was the forty-seventh edition of the Artistic Gymnastics World Championships. The competition was held from October 2–8, 2017, at the Olympic Stadium in Montreal, Quebec, Canada.

The event marked the first time since 2003 that the Championships had been held in North America. Montreal was also the host of the 1985 World Championships and the 1976 Summer Olympics. The event was part of Montreal's 375th anniversary and Canada's 150th anniversary celebrations, both of which were in fall of 2017.

Competition schedule 
All times are EDT (UTC–4).

Medalists

Overall standings

Overall medal table

Men's medal table

Women's medal table

Men's results

Individual all-around 
Oldest and youngest competitors

Floor 
Due to a dead spot on the floor in the last subdivision of qualifications that allowed a rotation of gymnasts to redo their floor routines, Bram Verhofstad of the Netherlands bumped out the original eighth-place qualifier Tomás González of Chile. After an appeal by the Chilean Gymnastics Federation, González was reinstated. As a result, there were nine gymnasts in the final.

Oldest and youngest competitors

Pommel horse 
Oldest and youngest competitors

Rings 
Oldest and youngest competitors

Vault 
Top qualifier Yang Hak-seon of South Korea withdrew with a hamstring injury and was replaced by first reserve Artur Dalaloyan of Russia in the final.

Oldest and youngest competitors

Parallel bars 
Oldest and youngest competitors

Horizontal bar 
With the successful completion of the double-twisting straight Kovac (aka double-twisting Cassina or Bretschneider straight) in competition by Hidetaka Miyachi of Japan (despite a fall on a different element in his routine) during the horizontal bar individual event final, the skill—now officially called the Miyachi on the horizontal bar—has been automatically named after him, the only element currently in men's artistic gymnastics to be assigned the new and highest difficulty score of I (0.9).

Oldest and youngest competitors

Women's results

Individual all-around 
Great Britain's Alice Kinsella withdrew before the final due to an ankle injury sustained in qualifications and was replaced by first reserve Lee Eun-ju of South Korea. Second-place qualifier Ragan Smith of the United States injured her ankle during warm-ups moments before the first event and withdrew. Second reserve Ioana Crișan of Romania replaced Smith in the top group, as there was no time to re-seed due to Smith's late withdrawal.

Oldest and youngest competitors

Vault 
Oldest and youngest competitors

Uneven bars 
Nina Derwael of Belgium is the first gymnast from her country to make an event final and her bronze was the first-ever medal for Belgium.

Oldest and youngest competitors

Balance beam 
Pauline Schäfer won the first-ever World Championships balance beam gold medal for Germany.

Oldest and youngest competitors

Floor 
Top qualifier Ragan Smith of the United States withdrew after sustaining an ankle injury in warm-ups for the all-around final earlier in the week; she was replaced by first reserve Ellie Black of Canada in the floor final. Mai Murakami won Japan's first-ever gold for women on the event.

Oldest and youngest competitors

Qualification

Men's results

Individual all-around

Floor

Pommel horse

Rings

Vault

Parallel bars

Horizontal bar

Women's results

Individual all-around

Vault

Uneven bars

Balance beam

Floor

Subdivisions

References

External links 
 Official website

 
2017
2017 in gymnastics
2017 in Canadian sports
2017 in Quebec
September 2017 sports events in Canada
October 2017 sports events in Canada
International gymnastics competitions hosted by Canada
Sports competitions in Montreal